Hans F. Bauer (1932 in Hollywood, California – 6 February 2009 in Costa Mesa, California) was an American research chemist. He was married and had 4 children.

Career
Bauer received a B.S. degree in Chemistry in 1954 from the University of California, Los Angeles.  He served in the United States Navy for 2 years after receiving his undergraduate degree (1954–1956).  He was discharged with the rank of Lieutenant (j.g.), and then returned to UCLA to work on a Ph.D. degree in Chemistry, which he received in 1960.

Bauer worked for several large chemical and research companies in the USA, including Occidental Petroleum, and the United States Department of Energy.

Honors and awards
Bauer held several US patents, including:
4087514 ( 2 May 1978) - Process for desulfurizing char
4155715 (22 May 1979) - Process for reducing organic content of char
4301137 (17 Nov 1981) - Removal of chlorine from pyrolysis vapors
5164054 (17 Nov 1992) - Low-cost process for hydrogen production
5198084 (30 Mar 1993) - Low-cost process for hydrogen production

The latter 2 patents described methods for producing molecular hydrogen from a mixture of hydrocarbon vapor and a source of carbon, in which the mixture is agitated by electromagnetic radiation.

References

20th-century American chemists
People from Hollywood, Los Angeles
1932 births
2009 deaths
University of California, Los Angeles alumni